skeyes, officially called Belgocontrol or in its complete form the Authority of airways, is the Belgian air navigation and traffic service provider for the civil airspace for which the Belgian State is responsible.

skeyes is a member of the Civil Air Navigation Services Organisation (CANSO), and is integrated into the Functional Airspace Block Europe Central (FABEC).

Zones of activities 
In Belgium, its zones of activities extend up to flight level 245, including the control of the airports of Brussels, Charleroi, Liege, Antwerp and Ostend.
In the Grand Duchy of Luxembourg, they apply between flight levels 145 or 165 up to flight level 245.

The sectors above flight level 245 fall within the competence of the Eurocontrol centre in Maastricht, to which Belgium has delegated air traffic control for its upper airspace.

Locations 

Skeyes has seven sites, located in Belgium. Five of them include the control towers of the Belgian international airports, and two are radar stations:
 Steenokkerzeel: main operating office, including CANAC (Computer Assisted National Air traffic control Center) and control tower for Brussels airport;
 Charleroi: control tower for Brussels South Charleroi Airport;
 Bierset: control tower for Liege Airport;
 Deurne: control tower for Antwerp International Airport;
 Ostend: control tower for Ostend–Bruges International Airport;
 Bertem: radar station;
 Saint-Hubert: radar station.

Legal status 
Skeyes is an autonomous public company, governed by the law of 21 March 1991.
This law, in its Title VI, defines its mission as follows:
 to ensure the safety of air navigation in the airspace for which the Belgian State is responsible [...];
 to ensure to the Brussels airport the control of the movements of aircraft during approach, landing, take-off and taxi, and to continue to ensure the safety of the air traffic of public regional airports and aerodromes [...];
 to provide police, airport and aeronautical investigation services with information relative to aircraft, their flying, their movements and the observable effects of those;
 to provide meteorological information for air navigation, as well as telecommunication services or other services [...].

From November 2018 onwards, Belgocontrol uses the trade name Skeyes.

References

External link

Air navigation service providers
Air traffic control in Europe
Aviation in Belgium
Aviation in Luxembourg
Steenokkerzeel